John Bell (June 19, 1796 – May 4, 1869) was a U.S. Representative from Ohio for two months in 1851, filling a vacancy created by his predecessor’s death.

Life and career 
Born in Pennsboro, Pennsylvania, Bell received a limited education. He moved to Ohio in 1810 with his parents, who settled in Greene County, near Xenia. He moved to Lower Sandusky in 1823 and served as mayor in 1830. He was the probate judge of Sandusky County for several terms.

Bell was commissioned a major general in the state militia in 1834 and commanded Ohio forces in the Toledo War the next year.

He served as postmaster of Lower Sandusky from November 14, 1838, to May 3, 1841. He served as member of the state house of representatives in 1844 and 1845. He served as mayor of Fremont, Ohio, in 1845 and 1846.

Bell was elected as a Whig to the Thirty-first Congress to fill the vacancy caused by the death of Amos E. Wood (January 7, 1851 – March 4, 1851).

Death 
He was a probate judge from 1852 to 1855 and again from 1858 to 1863. He died in Fremont, Ohio, on May 4, 1869 and was interred in Oakwood Cemetery (Fremont, Ohio).

Sources

1796 births
1869 deaths
People from Fremont, Ohio
American militia generals
Members of the Ohio House of Representatives
Mayors of places in Ohio
Ohio state court judges
Probate court judges in the United States
Whig Party members of the United States House of Representatives from Ohio
19th-century American politicians
19th-century American judges